Polsat Film is a Polish television channel which broadcasts movies.

Polsat received a license to broadcast on March 17, 2009, under the name "Polsat Kino". It started broadcasting on October 2, 2009. It is available from satellite platforms Cyfrowy Polsat, Cyfra+ and n. It was one of several channels launched by Polsat within a few months. It initially broadcasts between 11 a.m. and about 1 a.m.

During its first week on the air, it received a 0.31 percent share of overall viewing, which was about the same as established channels such as Hallmark Channel and Comedy Central.

On April 6, 2020 On August 29, 2021  Polsat Film changed its logo and graphic design along with neighboring Polsat Channels. Polsat Flim oprawy graficzny [2009 2020] Polsat Flim oprawy graficzny [2020 2021] Polsat Film oprawy graficzny 2021-obecnie   October 2, 2009 Apil 5, 2020 Apil 6, 2020 August 29, 2021 August 30, 2021 oprawy graficzny Polsat Flim 

The logo was changed again, on August 30, 2021 with the major rebranding of Polsat Film  and it's television channels.

External links

References

Polsat
Television channels in Poland
Television channels and stations established in 2009